Ebosia is a genus of marine ray-finned fishes belonging to the family Scorpaenidae, the scorpionfishes. They are known as falcate lionfishes.  They are native to the Indian and Pacific Oceans.

Taxonomy
Ebosia was described as a genus in 1904 by the American ichthyologists David Starr Jordan and Edwin Chapin Starks in 1904 with Pterois bleekeri, which had been described in 1884 by Ludwig Heinrich Philipp Döderlein from Tokyo, as the type species. This genus is classified within the tribe Pteroini of the subfamily Scorpaeninae within the family Scorpaenidae. The genus name is a latinisation of eboshi, a type of helmet which bears some resemblance to the parietal crests shown by the males in this genus.

Species
There are currently 4 recognized species in this genus:

Characteristics
Ebosia lionfishes are characterised by having the bases of the spines on the nuchal, parietal and coronal bones being continuous with the parietal spine being longer and, in males, creates a slender, bony crest.

Distribution and habitat
Ebosia lionfishes are found in the Indo-Pacific from the eastern coast of Africa between Somalia and South Africa across the Indian Ocean and eastwards into the Pacific Ocean as far as eastern Australia, north to Japan, Korea and China.

Biology
Ebosia lionfishes are, like other scorpionfishes, predatory. E. bleekeri is known to feed on small fishes and crustaceans.

References

Pteroini
Venomous fish
Marine fish genera
Taxa named by David Starr Jordan
Taxa named by Edwin Chapin Starks